The Tama Forest Reserve is found in Sierra Leone. It was established in 1926. This site is 170 km2.

References

Protected areas established in 1926
Forest reserves of Sierra Leone